Byron Barr (August 18, 1917 – November 3, 1966), sometimes billed as Byron S. Barr, was an American actor. He appeared in 19 films from 1944 to 1951.

Barr perhaps is best known for his role as Nino Zachetti in Double Indemnity, his first appearance. He also had a role in films like Love Letters, Pitfall, Down Dakota Way, They Made Me a Killer, and The File on Thelma Jordon. His only lead role came in the 1946 B-movie Tokyo Rose. Barr retired from acting in 1951. He died on November 3, 1966, in Sacramento County, California, of unknown causes at age 49.

Filmography 
 Double Indemnity (1944) - Nino Zachetti
 Practically Yours (1944) - Navigator (uncredited)
 The Affairs of Susan (1945) - Chick
 Love Letters (1945) - Derek Quinton
 Follow That Woman (1945) - John Evans
 Tokyo Rose (1946) - Pete Sherman
 They Made Me a Killer (1946) - Steve Reynolds
 Our Hearts Were Growing Up (1946) - Roger (uncredited)
 Big Town (1946) - Vance Crane
 Two Years Before the Mast (1946) - Friend (uncredited)
 Seven Were Saved (1947) - Lt. Martin Pinkert
 Public Prosecutor (1948, TV series) - Glenn Thursby
 The Main Street Kid (1948) - Bud Wheeling
 Pitfall (1948) - Bill Smiley
 Down Dakota Way (1949) - Steve Paxton
 The File on Thelma Jordon (1950) - McCary
 Paid in Full (1950) - Man at Bar (uncredited)
 Tarnished (1950) - Joe Pettigrew
 Appointment with Danger (1950) - Policeman (uncredited)
 Covered Wagon Raid (1950) - Roy Chandler (final film role)

External links

1917 births
1966 deaths
People from Corning, Iowa
Male actors from Iowa
20th-century American male actors